The Andaman horseshoe bat (Rhinolophus cognatus) is a species of bat in the family Rhinolophidae. It is endemic to the Andaman Islands.  During the day, it roosts in caves, but may also choose tree hollows.

Taxonomy
The Andaman horseshoe bat was first collected by Italian zoologist Enrico Hillyer Giglioli in May 1892. It was collected in Port Blair of the Andaman Islands. The specimen was taken to the Museo Civico di Storia Naturale di Genova, where it was described by Danish zoologist Knud Andersen in 1906.

As the horseshoe bat genus is very speciose, it is further divided into closely related species groups. The Andaman horseshoe bat is placed into the pusillus species group. Other species belonging to this species group include:
Acuminate horseshoe bat, R. acuminatus
Convex horseshoe bat, R. convexus
Little Japanese horseshoe bat, R. cornutus
Imaizumi's horseshoe bat, R. imaizumii
Blyth's horseshoe bat, R. lepidus
Formosan lesser horseshoe bat, R. monoceros
Osgood's horseshoe bat, R. osgoodi
Least horseshoe bat, R. pusillus
Shortridge's horseshoe bat, R. shortridgei
Little Nepalese horseshoe bat, R. subbadius

Description
They have long, spatulate lancets. The lateral margins of the lancet are concave. The forearm of this species measures . They roost in colonies of fewer than 50 individuals.

Biology
It is known to form mixed-species colonies. Other species that it will roost with include Dobson's horseshoe bat and the Pomona roundleaf bat. During January, individuals have been observed in a state of torpor. Their average generation time is 7.5 years.

Range and habitat
This species is only found on the Andaman Islands. It is not found on the nearby Nicobar Islands. During the day, it roosts in caves, although tree cavities are also sometimes used.

Conservation
During surveys in 2013 and 2014, it was noted that this species was absent from previous known roosts in several caves. This could be indicative of a decline in the number of subpopulations, or in the total population. Prior to 2008, this species was listed as vulnerable through the International Union for Conservation of Nature. In 2008, its status was revised to endangered. While it is not specifically protected by India's Wildlife Protection Act of 1972, most of its habitat is within protected areas or areas with restricted access. Possible threats to this species include disturbance related to edible-nest swiftlet nest harvesting.

References

Rhinolophidae
Bats of India
Endemic fauna of the Andaman Islands
Mammals described in 1906
Taxa named by Knud Andersen
Taxonomy articles created by Polbot